Jacob Sloat Fassett (November 13, 1853 – April 21, 1924) was a businessman, lawyer, and member of the United States House of Representatives from New York.

Early life
He was born on November 13, 1853, in Elmira, New York, the son of Newton Pomeroy Fassett and Martha Ellen (Sloat) Fassett. He attended the public schools of Elmira and graduated from the University of Rochester in 1875. He studied law at his father's firm, Smith, Robertson & Fassett, was admitted to the bar in 1878 and commenced practice in Elmira. He was District Attorney of Chemung County in 1878 and 1879. On February 13, 1879, he married in Sacramento, California, Jennie Louise Crocker (1860–1939), the daughter of Judge Edwin B. Crocker. Around this time Fassett became the proprietor of the Elmira Daily Advertiser. Afterwards he enrolled as a law student at Heidelberg University in Germany. He returned to Elmira in 1882 and began the practice of law.

Political career

Fassett was a member of the New York State Senate (27th D.) from 1884 to 1891, sitting in the 107th, 108th, 109th, 110th, 111th, 112th, 113th and 114th New York State Legislatures; and was President pro tempore from 1889 to 1891. He was a delegate to the 1880, 1892 and 1916 Republican National Conventions, and was Temporary Chairman in 1892. He was Secretary of the Republican National Committee from 1888 to 1892. President Benjamin Harrison appointed Fassett as Collector of the Port of New York, a post he held from August 1 to September 15, 1891, when he resigned to run for Governor of New York. At the 1891 New York state election, he was defeated by Democrat Roswell P. Flower.

Fassett was a delegate to the New York State Constitutional Convention of 1894. He was elected as a Republican to the 59th, 60th and 61st United States Congresses, holding office from March 4, 1905, to March 3, 1911. His last political role was as Chairman of the Republican advisory convention in 1918.

After retiring from politics, he resumed his work in the banking and lumber business in Elmira. He died on April 21, 1924 in Vancouver, British Columbia, Canada, while returning from a business trip to Japan and the Philippines. He was an investor in various mines among which was the Oriental Consolidated Mining Corporation in Korea, which was managed by his cousin, Spokane politician and metallurgist Charles M. Fassett. He was buried at the Woodlawn Cemetery in Elmira.

Legacy

Fassett, Quebec - The village of Fassett, Quebec in Canada is named after him.

Fassett's Point - Located in Falmouth, Massachusetts, this  portion of land on the north side of West Falmouth Harbor is divided into two portions:  which comprise "Little Island" and the other  are known as "Greycourt." (The Fassetts had been spending their summers in Gloucester at Cape Ann but sold their estate there in 1916 for $225,000 in what was called "One of the largest real estate deals ever recorded on Cape Ann"). After his death and then that of his wife in 1939, the estate was put up for sale for $35,000. By 1941 it had still not sold and their children had the estate destroyed and the land divided. Some of his descendants still live on the land of this great estate.

Fassett Elementary School - Elementary School in Elmira, New York.

Fassett Commons - In 1916, Mr. and Mrs. Jacob Fassett donated $30,000 to Elmira College for the construction of a dining hall. It became the main dining hall in 1917. It is connected to the north arm of Cowles Hall. Jacob Fassett favored the name Crocker Hall, opposing the choice of Fassett Commons. When construction costs grew beyond expectations, the Fassetts donated an additional $10,000. Faculty members of the art department have their offices in Fassett Commons, which is listed on the National Register of Historic Places.

Fassett Family - Although Jacob Sloat Fassett and Jennie Crocker had several children (one of whom was a doctor), none of them went into politics like their father. Their most famous child was Jacob Sloat Fassett, Jr. (1889–1973) or better known by his stage name as Jay Fassett who starred in several Hollywood films. Jay Fassett had a son, Jacob Sloat Fassett, III (1913–2002) who, like his father Jay, graduated from Cornell and then went into the hotel business buying a 50-room hotel in upstate New York when he was just 26 years old. Jacob Sloat Fassett, III lived his remaining years on what was left of the estate in West Falmouth.  The Congressman and his son Newton Crocker Fassett were partners in mining ventures with Spokane mayor Charles M. Fassett, a cousin of Jacob Sloat Fassett.

Kaffe Fassett is a well-known artist and designer living in London. He is the great-grandson of Jacob Sloat Fassett.

Fassett Pennsylvania - This town is named after Jacob Sloat Fassett's grandfather, Philo Fassett.

Sources
Portions of the text on this page were adapted from the public domain Biographical Directory of the United States Congress.
OCMC: Chosen Gold - TIME magazine

References

External links

1853 births
1924 deaths
County district attorneys in New York (state)
Republican Party New York (state) state senators
Politicians from Elmira, New York
University of Rochester alumni
Majority leaders of the New York State Senate
Collectors of the Port of New York
People from Falmouth, Massachusetts
Republican Party members of the United States House of Representatives from New York (state)
Burials at Woodlawn Cemetery (Elmira, New York)
Crocker family